Luigi Amedeo Melegari (19 February 1805 in Castelnovo di Sotto – 22 May 1881) was an Italian politician and diplomat. He was minister of foreign affairs of the Kingdom of Italy from 1876 to 1877. He served in the Senate of the Kingdom of Italy. He was a recipient of the Order of Saints Maurice and Lazarus. His daughter was the writer Dora Melegari.

References

1805 births
1881 deaths
People from the Province of Reggio Emilia
Foreign ministers of Italy
Members of the Senate of the Kingdom of Italy
Italian diplomats
19th-century Italian politicians
Commandeurs of the Légion d'honneur
Recipients of the Order of Saints Maurice and Lazarus